Insomniac with Dave Attell was an American television show on Comedy Central hosted by comedian Dave Attell, which ran from August 5, 2001 until November 11, 2004.

Overview
Host Dave Attell goes through a particular city at night, usually close to midnight beginning with his performance at a local comedy club, then going to various bars, clubs, and city landmarks. Along the way Attell cracks jokes with passersby and takes pictures with a disposable camera which would be shown during the end credits. Every episode concludes with the sun rising into the next morning and Attell saying his catchphrase "Get some sleep!"

Episodes include a visit to Chicago's world-famous The Wieners Circle, where the staff routinely got in cursing matches with their customers, and a visit to a Phoenix nudist camp.

U.S. cities featured on the show were Albuquerque, Anchorage, Atlanta, Austin, Baltimore, Boise, Boston, Charleston, Charlotte, Chicago, Cleveland, Columbus, Honolulu, Houston, Kansas City, Key West, Las Vegas, Little Rock, Long Island, Memphis, Miami, Myrtle Beach, Nashville, New Orleans, New York City, Oakland, Philadelphia, Phoenix, Portland, Reno, San Francisco and Salt Lake City. Other cities featured on the show were Amsterdam, Dublin, London, Montreal, Tijuana, Toronto, and specials that took place in Berlin, Rio de Janeiro, Tokyo and the Southern United States.

The 30-minute program ran for four seasons on Comedy Central and continued with four one-hour specials. In 2003, two volumes of the show under the title The Best of Insomniac Uncensored were released on DVD.

The producers of Insomniac were Nick McKinney, Dave Hamilton and Mala Chapple.  McKinney and Hamilton also directed all the episodes.  The show's theme song and series composer was Bob Golden.

Cities visited

Specials
 March on the South (North Carolina, South Carolina, Georgia)
 Rio Dave Janeiro (Rio de Janeiro)
 Sloshed in Translation (Tokyo)
 Insomni-Achtung Baby! (Berlin)

See also
 Dave Attell's Insomniac Tour

References

External links

Comedy Central original programming
Comedy Central late-night programming
2000s American late-night television series
2001 American television series debuts
2004 American television series endings
English-language television shows